Irouléguy is a commune in the Pyrénées-Atlantiques department in south-western France.

It is located in the former province of Lower Navarre. It is mainly known for the Irouléguy AOC wine which is grown on the vineyards of the area.

See also
Communes of the Pyrénées-Atlantiques department

References

External links

 IRULEGI in the Bernardo Estornés Lasa - Auñamendi Encyclopedia (Euskomedia Fundazioa) (in Spanish)

Communes of Pyrénées-Atlantiques
Lower Navarre
Pyrénées-Atlantiques communes articles needing translation from French Wikipedia